The 2012 Asia Women's Four Nations was the fifth edition of the tournament. It was hosted by China in Kunshan. The event took place on the 5th and 7th of July. Kazakhstan won their 3rd after defeating Japan 17–8 in the final.

Standings

Bracket

Results

Semi-finals

Third place

Final

References 

2012 in Asian rugby union
2012 in women's rugby union
Asia Rugby Women's Championship
Rugby union in China
Rugby union in Hong Kong
Rugby union in Japan
Rugby union in Kazakhstan
Asia Rugby
Asia Rugby Women's Championship